South Decatur Trolley Trail is a hiking and biking trail built by PATH in Atlanta, Georgia in the United States.

The right-of-way was originally a part of the South Atlanta's Metropolitan Street Railroad Company and the section of the trail was separated from public roadways.
The route which ran through Edgewood, Kirkwood and Oakhurst eventually became Route 18 of the Georgia Power Streetcar system but since it runs out-of-band is ideal for cyclists and runners today.

Protected areas of DeKalb County, Georgia
PATH Foundation
Rail trails in Georgia (U.S. state)
Transportation in DeKalb County, Georgia
Bike paths in Georgia (U.S. state)